Amadu Baldé (born 27 July 2005) is a Bissau-Guinean professional footballer who plays as a winger for the Sporting CP U17s.

Professional career
On 15 September 2021, Baldé signed his first professional contract with Real S.C., with a 15 million euro release clause at the age of 16. In his debut season he made 3 appearances in the 3 Liga. On 19 September 2022, he transferred to the Primeira Liga club Sporting CP, and was assigned to their U17s. In September 2022, he was named by English newspaper The Guardian as one of the best players born in 2005 worldwide.

References

External links
 

2005 births
Living people
Sportspeople from Bissau
Bissau-Guinean footballers
Association football wingers
Real S.C. players
Sporting CP footballers
Bissau-Guinean expatriate footballers
Bissau-Guinean expatriates in Portugal
Expatriate footballers in Portugal